The Spanish ironclad Tetuán was an armored frigate built in the royal dockyard at Ferrol during the 1860s for the Spanish Navy. She was captured by rebels during the Cantonal Revolution in 1873 and participated in the Battle off Cartagena. While under repair after the battle, the ship was destroyed by fire and broken up in 1874.

Description as an ironclad
The ship displaced . She had a single horizontal trunk steam engine that drove her propeller using steam provided by eight boilers. For long-distance travel, Tetuán was fitted with three masts and ship rigged. She carried  of coal.

The ship was armed with thirty 68-pounder smoothbore guns.

Construction and career
Tetuán, named for the 1860 Battle of Tétouan, was built by the Royal dockyard in Ferrol. She was laid down in May 1861 and launched in March 1863 and completed in January 1866.

In mid-1873, the First Spanish Republic was beset with the Cantonal Revolution while fighting the Third Carlist War. The revolutionaries seized Cartagena on 12 July while the bulk of the Mediterranean Squadron was in port. The German and British ironclads SMS Friedrich Carl and  seized Vitoria and a wooden steam frigate as pirates after they threatened to bombard Almeria unless a ransom was paid and later turned them over the national government on 26 September. On 11 October, all three Cantonist ironclads, Numancia, Tetuan, and Méndez Núñez were at sea when they were attacked near Cartagena by a small government fleet led by Vitoria. Reluctant to actually sink the rebel ships, the government ships kept their distance and thwarted rebel attempt to close with them. The latter suffered 13 dead and 49 wounded in the skirmish, although Tetuán was damaged in the battle. The ship was under repair when she was destroyed by fire (either by accident or deliberately) on 30 or 31 December, two weeks before the city surrendered to government forces.

Footnotes

References

External links
La Marina Blindada en el Siglo XIX

1863 ships
Ships built in Spain
Ironclad warships of the Spanish Navy
Ship fires
Maritime incidents in December 1873
Shipwrecks of Spain